The 2008 Buffalo Funds - NAIA Division I men's basketball tournament was held from March 19 to 25 at Municipal Auditorium in Kansas City, Missouri. The 71st annual NAIA basketball tournament features 32 teams playing in a single-elimination format. 

The official announcement of the 32-team field for the 71st  Annual Buffalo Funds-NAIA Division I National Championship occurred late on Tuesday, March 11, with the announcement of the official bracket on Wednesday, March 12 at 5 p.m. CST. Early opening round action between No. 5 Mountain State and Olivet Nazarene went into two long overtimes. This caused a backup in game schedules. The late game featuring Southern Nazarene University and Point Loma Nazarene University was moved back from 10:30pm CST to 11:30pm CST. The late start caused many of the 3,000 fans to leave after halftime. Near the end of the game SNU rallied to tie the SeaLions 67-67 with 14 secs left sending the game into overtime. The game finally ended around 1:30am CST with Point Loma pulling off the upset over SNU. It was the latest finishing NAIA tournament game. Games for the next day started in about 6 hours.

The championship game featured defending champions 7 seed Oklahoma City University and 5 seed Mountain State. Oklahoma City won the game, giving them back to back National Championships in win over Mountain State (75-72). Oklahoma City is the first team since Life University (Ga.) won the '99-'00 titles. Oklahoma City was making its third straight NAIA title game appearance, becoming the first team since Kentucky State University from 1970-72 to so. The Stars were defeated in the 2006 championship game by Texas Wesleyan University, 67-65.

Awards and honors
Leading scorer: Othyus Jeffers, Robert Morris (IL)
Leading rebounder: Nestor Colmenares, Campbellsville
Dr. James Naismith-Emil S. Liston Sportsmanship Award: Campbellsville
Charles A. Krigel Award: Keith Adkins, Campbellsville
Chuck Walden Memorial Trophy: Kansas City Life Insurance Company
Frank Cramer Award: John Kornitzer, Buffalo Funds
Most consecutive tournament appearances: 17th, Georgetown (KY)
Most tournament appearances: Georgetown (KY), 27th of 30, appearances to the NAIA Tournament
Oklahoma City notched its 47th tournament win, moving past Central Washington for sole possession of third place on the all-time list. The Stars trail Georgetown College (Ky.), which has a record 49 wins, and Oklahoma Baptist, which has 48 victories.

2008 NAIA bracket

See also
2008 NAIA Division I women's basketball tournament
2008 NCAA Division I men's basketball tournament
2008 NCAA Division II men's basketball tournament
2008 NCAA Division III men's basketball tournament
2008 NAIA Division II men's basketball tournament

References

NAIA Men's Basketball Championship
Tournament
NAIA Division I men's basketball tournament
NAIA Division I men's basketball tournament